Deep Red, also known as The Hatchet Murders, is a 1975 Italian giallo film directed by Dario Argento and co-written by Argento and Bernardino Zapponi. It stars David Hemmings as a musician who investigates a series of murders performed by a mysterious figure wearing black leather gloves. The cast also stars Daria Nicolodi, Gabriele Lavia, Macha Méril, and Clara Calamai. The film's score was composed and performed by Goblin, the first in a long-running collaboration with Argento.

The film was released during the height of the "giallo craze" of Italian popular cinema, and was a critical and commercial success. Retrospective reviews have been equally positive, and the film is considered one of the genre's definitive entries, as well as one of Argento's best works.

Plot
During Christmas at a family home, one figure stabs another to death. A bloody knife falls to the floor at a child's feet. Twenty years later in Turin, Professor Giordani chairs a parapsychology conference featuring psychic medium Helga Ulmann. Helga is suddenly overwhelmed by the "twisted, perverted, murderous" thoughts of someone in the audience and claims hearing a child's song. She believes she can identify this person; an unseen figure suddenly leaves the theater.

Later that night, a black-gloved figure invades Helga's apartment and attacks her with a meat cleaver. English Jazz musician and bandleader Marcus Daly sees the murder from the window as he passes by, and rushes to her apartment, finding her mutilated corpse. After the police arrive, Marcus thinks one of the apartment's paintings has disappeared, but he cannot pinpoint what exactly is missing.

The media identifies Marcus as the eyewitness and shows reporter Gianna Brezzi's photo of him. The next morning, after arguing with Gianna about women's liberation, Marcus visits his friend's home, Carlo,  to check on him but only finds Carlo's eccentric mother Martha, who seems interested in Marcus. Back in his house, someone plays a recording of a child's song outside Marcus' door; he manages to lock the door before the person can enter, but he hears the gruff whisper, "I'll kill you sooner or later." Marcus tells Giordani, whom he met at Helga's funeral, about the encounter. Giordani, noting that Helga also heard a child's song, recalls a book of modern folklore describing a local haunted house where a child's song is sometimes heard. Feeling guilty for taking his photo, Gianna begins helping Marcus.

Marcus reads the folklore book and finds a photo of the house in it. He rips out the picture, planning to learn more from the book's author. However, the killer, who has been watching Marcus, attacks the author and drowns her in scalding water. Using the photo, Marcus finds and investigates the huge abandoned house. Under sheetrock he uncovers a disturbing mural: a child holding a bloody knife over a dead body. After he leaves, a loose chunk of sheetrock falls away, revealing another person at the scene depicted in the drawing. Meanwhile, Giordani, who has been assisting Marcus' investigation, visits the scene of the author's murder and uses steam to find a clue written on the mirror. However, later the killer distracts him with a mechanized doll, before murdering him. 

Marcus finds a walled-off room in the abandoned house. In the middle of the dusty floor sits a desiccated corpse. Someone knocks Marcus unconscious as he backs away in horror. He awakens outside the house, which is burning. Gianna appears, explaining that she got his message about investigating the house and arrived in time to save him. As Marcus and Gianna wait at the caretaker's house for the police, Marcus notices that the caretaker's daughter has drawn a picture identical to the hidden mural he found in the house. She tells him she saw the picture in the archives of the local school.

Marcus and Gianna immediately go to the school. Marcus finds the drawing in a schoolboy's record. When Gianna leaves to call the police, someone stabs her. Marcus corners the attacker–it is Carlo, who as a kid drew the disturbing pictures. The police arrive, and Carlo flees into the dark street where a garbage truck hits him and drags him down the street. When the truck stops, an oncoming car runs over Carlo's head.

At the hospital, Marcus learns that Gianna has survived. Remembering that the night Helga died he met Carlo utterly intoxicated and coming from a very different direction than the scene of the killing, Marcus reinvestigates the apartment crime scene. There, he has an epiphany: the night of Helga's murder it was not a missing painting he saw when he entered the apartment, but rather a reflection of the killer, framed in a mirror. As Marcus realizes he saw Martha, Carlo's mother, she appears behind him with a meat cleaver. Martha explains that she murdered her husband, while the child's song played in the back, in front of the young Carlo, as he had intended to put her in an insane asylum. She then walled off the room containing his body. Carlo, scarred psychologically, tried to repress the memory of the homicide compulsively drawing it and later taking up alcohol: he attacked Marcus and Gianna to protect his murderous mother from their investigation.

Martha attacks Marcus and wounds him with the cleaver. After Martha's necklace tangles in the bars of the building's elevator, Marcus sends the elevator down, decapitating her.

Cast

Background

Deep Red represented Argento's return to the horror genre after an attempted breakaway with the historical dramedy The Five Days (1974). It was his last giallo film before Tenebre (1982), which was produced years after the genre's heyday.

The film was also his first collaboration with actress Daria Nicolodi, with whom he would begin a relationship during this film, and progressive rock band Goblin, who composed and performed the film score. Argento would collaborate with Nicolodi five more times, and Goblin or its frontman Claudio Simonetti ten more times. Nicolodi would also co-write the screenplay for Suspiria.

Production 

The film was shot mainly on-location in Turin in sixteen weeks. Additional scenes were shot in Rome and Perugia. Argento chose Turin because at the time there were more practising Satanists there than in any other European city, excluding Lyon. He had previously shot parts of The Cat o' Nine Tails (1971) in the city. Filming locations included Santa Costanza Church and Teatro Carignano. Argento would later revisit Carignano 25 years later in Sleepless (2001). The "House of the Screaming Child" was Villa Scott, a historical villa owned at the time by a convent of nuns and operated as a boarding school.

Argento's original working title for the film was La Tigre dei Denti a Sciabola (The Sabre-Toothed Tiger), matching the "animal" motif of his previous gialli.

Co-writer Bernardino Zapponi said the inspiration for the murder scenes came from him and Argento thinking of painful injuries to which the audience could relate, as the pain of being stabbed or shot is outside the experience of most viewers. Their original screenplay ran approximately 500 pages, but after it was deemed unfilmable, Argento shortened it to 321. The use of a psychic medium originated from an early draft of Four Flies on Grey Velvet (1971).

The close-up shots of the killer's hands, clad in black leather gloves, were performed by director Dario Argento himself. Argento was convinced that having all the killing scenes performed by himself would be quicker and easier than teaching the moves to an actor, who would require endless re-takes to perform everything to the director's satisfaction. The film's special effects, which include several mechanically operated heads and body parts, were created and executed by Carlo Rambaldi.

As was common in Italian filmmaking at the time, Deep Red was shot without sync sound, and all dialogue was dubbed in post-production. The screenplay was written in both Italian and English, all actors except for Clara Calamai spoke in English. The Italian dub cast included Isa Bellini (Calamai), Wanda Tettoni (Del Balzo), and Corrado Gaipa (Meniconi). The English dub cast included Cyril Cusack, Ted Rusoff, Carolyn De Fonseca, Geoffrey Copleston, Michael Forest, and Edward Mannix. David Hemmings dubbed himself.

Release
Deep Red was released in Milan and Rome in Italy on 7 March 1975.
In the United States, the film first premiered in New York City on 9 June 1976 and saw a wide theatrical release
on 11 June 1976 by the defunct US independent film distributor Howard Mahler Films. The film was once again re-released
and re-titled in the US on 18 January 1980, as The Hatchet Murders, and again in 1982 as The Phantom of Terror. Unlike Argento's previous features, the film did not have a wide cinema release in the UK. The 1982 video release on Fletcher Video was uncertificated. The first formal submission to the BBFC for classification was made by Redemption Films for their VHS release in 1993. It was passed 18 with 11s of cuts (to 'fighting' dogs), and reframing (of a lizard apparently impaled alive on a blade) on 03/12/1993 (all cuts were subsequently waived, see below).

Critical reception
The film holds a 93% approval rating on review aggregation website Rotten Tomatoes, based on 29 reviews with an average rating of 8.1/10. The site's consensus reads: "The kinetic camerawork and brutal over-the-top gore that made Dario Argento famous is on full display, but the addition of a compelling, complex story makes Deep Red a masterpiece." On Metacritic, the film has a weighted average score of 89 out of 100 based on 7 critic reviews, indicating "universal acclaim". One negative review upon the film's original American release came from Vincent Canby in The New York Times, who referred to the film as a "bucket of ax-murder-movie cliches" and called Dario Argento "a director of incomparable incompetence."

From retrospective reviews, Kim Newman wrote in the Monthly Film Bulletin that Deep Red was a transitional work for Argento between his earlier whodunit plots and the more supernatural themed films. Newman concluded that Deep Red is "nothing if not an elaborate mechanism, with the camera crawling among objets trouvés" and "what sets Argento apart from imitators like Lucio Fulci is his combination of genuine pain (the murders are as nasty as one could wish, but the camera flinches where Fulci's would linger) and self-mocking humour" Total Film gave the film four stars out of five, noting that Argento's films "can be an acquired taste; it's necessary to attune yourself with the horror director's style in order to get the most from his movies." The review stated that the film "presents some striking visual compositions that raise it above the level of the usual subgenre offerings." and that the film was "A great introduction to Dario Argento's evolving style of horror". The A.V. Club wrote, "Operating under the principle that a moving camera is always better than a static one – and not above throwing in a terrifying evil doll – Deep Red showcases the technical bravado and loopy shock tactics that made Argento famous." AllMovie compared the film to other in Argento's work, noting that the film script was "significantly stronger and the actors much better" AllMovie noted that "Each of the murders is perfectly choreographed with particular praise going to Glauco Mauri's killing" and that "The final reel wraps the film up in a thrilling manner and features two extremely graphic deaths that leave the viewer stunned as the credits roll"

Quentin Tarantino described being "rattled" by the movie as a teenager, and picked it as one of his favorite horror movies.

Home video
Multiple versions of the film exist on DVD and VHS, in large part due to the fact that Argento removed twenty-six minutes (largely scenes between Nicolodi and Hemmings) from the film, footage that was never dubbed in English. For years, it was assumed that the film's American distributors were responsible for removing said scenes, but the recent Blu-ray release confirmed that Argento oversaw and approved the edits to the film.

Eleven seconds of animal cruelty cuts made to the film by the BBFC in 1993 were waived when the film was re-submitted in 2010. Upon consideration, examiners concluded that the 'fighting' dogs were actually playing, and a letter sent from the production company stated that the lizard on a knife was a 'visual effect'.

In 1999, Anchor Bay acquired the rights to release the film uncut on both DVD and VHS. Their version restored the missing footage but kept the American end credit scene (a freeze-frame shot of Hemmings looking down into a pool of blood). As there were no dubbed versions of the missing scenes, the scenes (and additional dialogue omitted in the dubbed version) were featured in their original Italian language. The DVD offered both English and Italian audio tracks as well.

Blue Underground obtained the rights to the film in 2008 and released it as a standard DVD. Their Blu-ray release, released in 2011, contains the US version of the film (which is referred to as "The Director's Cut") and the original edit (referred to as "Uncut" and contains option to watch it in either language).

Arrow Films, a distributor of the United Kingdom, acquired the rights to the film and released it on January 3, 2011. The 2-disc set was released uncut as part of the now out-of-print window slip cover sets which released a number of films by Argento and other directors; it contained several special features including interviews, a documentary, trailers, audio commentary, four cover artwork designs, an exclusive collector's booklet written by Alan Jones on the film, and a double-sided poster. Both the director's cut and the theatrical cut are available on the set with an English and Italian audio track, and English subtitles. On January 25, 2016, Arrow Films released Deep Red in a 3-disc Limited Edition set of 3000 copies. The edition is available in new 4K restoration, with new commissioned artwork exclusive from Arrow Films. The original version of the film, as well as US cut are available, with new special features including a soundtrack CD featuring 28 tracks, 6 lobby cards, double-sided poster, reversible sleeve, and a limited edition booklet written by Mikel J. Koven. Bonus features from the previous edition are also included. A standard version of the Limited Edition was released on May 30, 2016 in a single-disc set and contains only the director's cut/original version. Special features from the edition are available.

On November 6, 2013, Australian distributor, Umbrella Entertainment made the film available with both the director's cut and the theatrical cut included.

Soundtrack

Argento originally contacted jazz pianist and composer Giorgio Gaslini to score the film; however, he was unhappy with Gaslini's output. After failing to get Pink Floyd to replace Gaslini, Argento turned back to Italy and found Goblin, a  local progressive rock band. Their leader Claudio Simonetti impressed Argento by producing two compositions within just one night. Argento signed them immediately, and they ended up composing most of the film's musical score (three Gaslini compositions were retained in the final version). Subsequently, Goblin composed music for several other films by Dario Argento.

The soundtrack was made available for the first time ever on vinyl after Waxwork Records released the complete score by Goblin on a triple LP. In addition to Goblin's music, the LP also included instrumental and alternate tracks by Gaslini.

Legacy
Two key sequences in this film influenced directors of later horror movies: the lead-up to the famous exploding head scene in David Cronenberg's Scanners is modeled after the parapsychology discussion at the beginning of Deep Red, and Rick Rosenthal's Halloween II contains a scalding water death inspired by the death of Giuliana Calandra's character Amanda Righetti here.

Director James Wan has cited the works of Dario Argento as an influence for the Saw horror series, and Billy the Puppet, the avatar of the series' villain, is visually similar to the mechanical doll that menaces Giordani in Deep Red.

The film's title, Profondo Rosso, is the name of a Rome horror memorabilia store owned and operated by Argento and Luigi Cozzi.

Unproduced remake
In 2010, George A. Romero was contacted by Claudio Argento to direct a 3D remake of Deep Red, which Claudio said would also involve Dario. Romero showed some interest in the film; however, after contacting Dario – who said he knew nothing about the remake – Romero declined Claudio's offer.

Stage adaptation 
In 2007, Argento directed a musical theatre adaptation of Deep Red with music by Claudio Simonetti. The role of Marcus was played by Michel Altieri.

Alternate versions
 The original Italian version is 126 minutes long. Most US versions remove 22 minutes' worth of footage, including the most graphic violence, all humorous scenes, almost all of the romantic scenes between David Hemmings and Daria Nicolodi, and part of the subplot regarding the house of the screaming child.
 The US video release by Anchor Bay Entertainment is mostly restored, reinstating gore shots and scenes with dialogue that were cut from the initial US release. It was likely that these scenes were cut before the English dub was prepared, so they now only exist with an Italian dub (English subtitles are provided for these scenes). In the original theatrical version, the end credits are displayed over a shot of Marcus' reflection in a pool of blood. The image is moving (blood drips into the pool, Hemmings' face changes expression, etc.) while the credits are displayed. Anchor Bay's release features the credits over a freeze-frame of the original shot. Other than this change, the Anchor Bay VHS/DVD is the full, uncut version of the film.
 The later DVD release from Blue Underground is the exact version mentioned above. Also, Blue Underground released an "Uncensored English Version" on DVD on 17 May 2011. This cut of the film runs no more than 105 minutes, with the gore from the original Italian version intact but the other cuts from the edited English version again excised.
 The film had no UK theatrical release. The 1993 Redemption video was cut by 11 seconds to remove a brief scene of two dogs fighting and shots of a live lizard impaled with a pin. The 2005 Platinum DVD issue was pre-cut (to exclude the shot of the lizard) and restored the dog sequence (as it was evident that they were playing rather than fighting). It was finally passed uncut for the 2010 Arrow DVD release.
 The full-length Italian version (with English subtitles and one small cut by UK censors) is available on video in the UK in pan and scan format from Redemption Films. The only known widescreen print of this version can be found in Australia on both SBS TV and its pay-TV channel World Movies, completely uncut. (Note that the widescreen laserdisc release is in English language and was cut by director Argento himself by about 12 minutes).
 Some releases of the film incorporate a still from the film, revealing the murderer.

See also
 Profondo Rosso (store)

References

External links
 
 
  – 98 minute edited U.S. theatrical version (101 minutes with credits) in pan-and-scan format
 Commentary by DVD Talk critic Michael Mackenzie

1975 LGBT-related films
1970s thriller films
1975 films
Films scored by Goblin (band)
Films directed by Dario Argento
Giallo films
Italian LGBT-related films
Italian horror thriller films
1970s Italian-language films
Home invasions in film
LGBT-related horror films
Paranormal films
Films with screenplays by Dario Argento
Italian serial killer films
Films set in country houses
Films set in Turin
Films shot in Turin
Films shot in Rome
1970s Christmas horror films
Italian exploitation films
Italian splatter films
1970s Italian films